John Fredric G. Wade (born 1968) is a United States Navy vice admiral who has served as the commander of Joint Task Force Red Hill since September 12, 2022. He previously served as the director of operations of the United States Indo-Pacific Command from October 2020 to September 2022. 

Wade graduated from the United States Naval Academy in 1990 with a B.S. degree in economics. He later earned a master's degree in information systems technology from the Naval Postgraduate School and a second master's degree in national security strategy from the National War College.

References

External links

1968 births
Living people
Place of birth missing (living people)
United States Naval Academy alumni
Naval Postgraduate School alumni
National War College alumni
United States Navy admirals